This is a list of Wake Forest Demon Deacons football players in the NFL Draft.

Key

Selections

References

Wake Forest

Wake Forest Demon Deacons NFL Draft